Kène ya ma kène... or Once Upon Our Time is a 2010 Tunisian documentary film directed by Hichem Ben Ammar and starring Bacem Anas Romdhani.

Synopsis 
In a popular neighborhood of Tunis, a trombonist dreams of his son, Bacem Anas Romdhani, becoming a great musician. The son makes his father's dream his own, and develops extraordinary aptitudes with the violin. After winning several international competitions, he is offered the chance to enroll in the prestigious Yehudi Menuhin School in London. The film shows Anès' journey, the obstacles he faces on the way, and his evolution while in Europe.

Cast 

 Bacem Anas Romdhani

Awards 
Verona African Film Festival 2010
African, Asian and Latin American Film Festival of Milan 2010

References

External links 

2010 films
Tunisian documentary films
2010 documentary films
Documentary films about African music
Documentary films about classical music and musicians